Susanna Justine McGibbon (born 11 November 1967) is a barrister and senior British civil servant who currently serves as HM Procurator General, Treasury Solicitor and Head of the Government Legal Service, and so Permanent Secretary of the Government Legal Department. She previously served as Director General of the Government Legal Department and Director General of the Department for Work and Pensions' Legal Group.

Early life and education 

McGibbon was born on 11 November 1967 to Ian McGibbon and Gwen McGibbon. She was educated at Bolton County Grammar School and then later at Canon Slade School, both in Bolton. She studied law at the University of Sheffield, graduating with a Bachelor of Laws (LLB) in 1989. After university, she completed the Bar Vocational Course (BVC) at the Inns of Court School of Law.

Career 

McGibbon worked as a private practice barrister after being called to the bar at Lincoln's Inn in 1990. Following a brief spell in private practice, McGibbon joined the Government Legal Profession first at the Foreign and Commonwealth Office before moving to the Treasury Solicitor's Department (GLD) in 1998 (where she also worked in the Ministry of Defence for two years). This was followed by employment in the Department for Education and Skills in 2000 and the Cabinet Office in 2002.

McGibbon then served as Legal Director for the Department for Trade and Industry (later Business, Enterprise and Regulatory Reform (2007) and Business, Innovation and Skills (2009)) from 2006 to 2009. Afterwards, she served as Legal Director for the Department for Communities and Local Government from 2009 to 2012.

In 2012, McGibbon became Director of Litigation in the GLD, tasked with conducting domestic litigation on behalf of most UK government departments. In 2018, McGibbon was appointed as Director General (Directorate B).

On 18 February 2021, it was announced that the Cabinet Secretary had, with the approval of the Prime Minister, appointed McGibbon to be the new Treasury Solicitor following the resignation of Sir Jonathan Jones. She took up the appointment on 8 March 2021.

Family and personal life 

McGibbon married Patrick Spencer in 2004. She lists her recreations as travel (particularly Europe and Asia), music and "generally enjoying London life".

References 

Living people
English barristers
English civil servants
Members of Lincoln's Inn
Treasury Solicitors
Alumni of the University of Sheffield
Civil servants in the Department for Work and Pensions
1967 births